A protocell (or protobiont) is a self-organized, endogenously ordered, spherical collection of lipids proposed as a stepping-stone toward the origin of life. A central question in evolution is how simple protocells first arose and how they could differ in reproductive output, thus enabling the accumulation of novel biological emergences over time, i.e. biological evolution. Although a functional protocell has not yet been achieved in a laboratory setting, the goal to understand the process appears well within reach.

Overview
Compartmentalization was important in the origins of life. Membranes form enclosed compartments that are separate from the external environment, thus providing the cell with functionally specialized aqueous spaces. As the lipid bilayer of membranes is impermeable to most hydrophilic molecules (dissolved by water), cells have membrane transport-systems that achieve the import of nutritive molecules as well as the export of waste. It is very challenging to construct protocells from molecular assemblies. An important step in this challenge is the achievement of vesicle dynamics that are relevant to cellular functions, such as membrane trafficking and self-reproduction, using amphiphilic molecules. On the primitive Earth, numerous chemical reactions of organic compounds produced the ingredients of life. Of these substances, amphiphilic molecules might be the first player in the evolution from molecular assembly to cellular life. A step from vesicle toward protocell might be to develop self-reproducing vesicles coupled with the metabolic system.

Another approach to the notion of a protocell concerns the term "chemoton" (short for 'chemical automaton') which refers to an abstract model for the fundamental unit of life introduced by Hungarian theoretical biologist Tibor Gánti. It is the oldest known computational abstract of a protocell. Gánti conceived the basic idea in 1952 and formulated the concept in 1971 in his book The Principles of Life (originally written in Hungarian, and translated to English only in 2003). He surmised the chemoton as the original ancestor of all organisms, or the last universal common ancestor.

The basic assumption of the chemoton model is that life should fundamentally and essentially have three properties: metabolism, self-replication, and a bilipid membrane. The metabolic and replication functions together form an autocatalytic subsystem necessary for the basic functions of life, and a membrane encloses this subsystem to separate it from the surrounding environment. Therefore, any system having such properties may be regarded as alive, and it will be subjected to natural selection and contain a self-sustaining cellular information. Some consider this model a significant contribution to origin of life as it provides a philosophy of evolutionary units. It is possible that protocells might have had a primitive Wood-Ljungdahl pathway that inhabited at alkaline hydrothermal vents or other geological environments. Iron meteorites are known to be composed of elements found in the Wood-Ljungdahl pathway.

Selectivity for compartmentalization

Self-assembled vesicles are essential components of primitive cells. The second law of thermodynamics requires that the universe move in a direction in which disorder (or entropy) increases, yet life is distinguished by its great degree of organization. Therefore, a boundary is needed to separate life processes from non-living matter. The cell membrane is the only cellular structure that is found in all of the cells of all of the organisms on Earth.

In the aqueous environment in which all known cells function, a non-aqueous barrier is required to surround a cell and separate it from its surroundings. To be an entity, distinguished from the environment, requires a barrier to free diffusion. The necessity of thermodynamically isolating a subsystem is an irreducible condition of life. Such isolation is ordinarily accomplished by membranes, amphiphilic bilayers of a thickness of around 10−8 meters.

Researchers including Irene A. Chen and Jack W. Szostak have demonstrated that simple physicochemical properties of elementary protocells can give rise to simpler conceptual analogues of essential cellular behaviors, including primitive forms of Darwinian competition and energy storage. Such cooperative interactions between the membrane and encapsulated contents could greatly simplify the transition from replicating molecules to true cells. Competition for membrane molecules would favor stabilized membranes, suggesting a selective advantage for the evolution of cross-linked fatty acids and even the phospholipids of today. This micro-encapsulation allowed for metabolism within the membrane, exchange of small molecules and prevention of passage of large substances across it. The main advantages of encapsulation include increased solubility of the cargo and creating energy in the form of chemical gradient. Energy is thus often said to be stored by cells in the structures of molecules of substances such as carbohydrates (including sugars), lipids, and proteins, which release energy when chemically combined with oxygen during cellular respiration.

Energy gradient

A March 2014 study by NASA's Jet Propulsion Laboratory demonstrated a unique way to study the origins of life: fuel cells. Fuel cells are similar to biological cells in that electrons are also transferred to and from molecules. In both cases, this results in electricity and power. The study states that one important factor was that the Earth provides electrical energy at the seafloor. "This energy could have kick-started life and could have sustained life after it arose. Now, we have a way of testing different materials and environments that could have helped life arise not just on Earth, but possibly on Mars, Europa and other places in the Solar System."

Vesicles, micelles and membraneless droplets

When phospholipids are placed in water, the molecules spontaneously arrange such that the tails are shielded from the water, resulting in the formation of membrane structures such as bilayers, vesicles, and micelles. In modern cells, vesicles are involved in metabolism, transport, buoyancy control, and enzyme storage. They can also act as natural chemical reaction chambers. A typical vesicle or micelle in aqueous solution forms an aggregate with the hydrophilic "head" regions in contact with surrounding solvent, sequestering the hydrophobic single-tail regions in the micelle centre. This phase is caused by the packing behavior of single-tail lipids in a bilayer. Although the protocellular self-assembly process that spontaneously form lipid monolayer vesicles and micelles in nature resemble the kinds of primordial vesicles or protocells that might have existed at the beginning of evolution, they are not as sophisticated as the bilayer membranes of today's living organisms.

Rather than being made up of phospholipids, early membranes may have formed from monolayers or bilayers of fatty acids, which may have formed more readily in a prebiotic environment. Fatty acids have been synthesized in laboratories under a variety of prebiotic conditions and have been found on meteorites, suggesting their natural synthesis in nature.

Oleic acid vesicles represent good models of membrane protocells that could have existed in prebiotic times.

Electrostatic interactions induced by short, positively charged, hydrophobic peptides containing seven amino acids in length or fewer, can attach RNA to a vesicle membrane, the basic cell membrane.

Suitable prebiotic environments

It has been proposed that life began in hydrothermal vents in the deep sea, but a 2012 study suggests that hot springs have the ideal characteristics for the origin of life. The conclusion is based mainly on the chemistry of modern cells, where the cytoplasm is rich in potassium, zinc, manganese, and phosphate ions, not widespread in marine environments. Such conditions, the researchers argue, are found only where hot hydrothermal fluid brings the ions to the surface—places such as geysers, mud pots, fumaroles and other geothermal features. Within these fuming and bubbling basins, water laden with zinc and manganese ions could have collected, cooled and condensed in shallow pools. However, a recent discovery of alkaline hydrothermal vents with an ionic concentration of sodium lower than in seawater suggests that high concentrations of potassium can be found at marine environments.

A study in the 1990s showed that montmorillonite clay can help create RNA chains of as many as 50 nucleotides joined together spontaneously into a single RNA molecule. Later, in 2002, it was discovered that by adding montmorillonite to a solution of fatty acid micelles (lipid spheres), the clay sped up the rate of vesicle formation 100-fold. 

Some minerals can catalyze the stepwise formation of hydrocarbon tails of fatty acids from hydrogen and carbon monoxide gases—gases that may have been released from hydrothermal vents or geysers. Fatty acids of various lengths are eventually released into the surrounding water, but vesicle formation requires a higher concentration of fatty acids, so it is suggested that protocell formation started at land-bound hydrothermal freshwater environments such as geysers, mud pots, fumaroles and other geothermal features where water evaporates and concentrates the solute.

In 2019, Nick Lane and colleagues show that vesicles form readily in seawater conditions at pH between 6.5 and >12 and temperatures 70 °C, meant to mimic the conditions of alkaline hydrothermal vents, with the presence of lipid mixtures, however a prebiotic source to such mixtures is unclear. Simple amphiphilic compounds in seawater do not assemble into vesicles because of the high concentration of ionic solutes. In hot spring conditions, self-assembly of vesicles occurs, which have a lower concentration of ionic solutes. Scientists oligomerized RNA in alkaline hydrothermal vent conditions in the laboratory. Although they were estimated to be 4 units in length, it implies RNA polymers possibly were synthesized at such environments. Experimental research at hot springs gave higher yields of RNA-like polymers than in the laboratory. The polymers were encapsulated in fatty acid vesicles when rehydrated, further supporting the hot spring hypothesis of abiogenesis. UV exposure have been shown to promote the synthesis of stable biomolecules like nucleotides. Research has shown that vesicles are binded and stabilized by prebiotic amino acids while in the presence of salt ions and magnesium ions, stabilization and binding increases by continuous wet-dry cycling.

In the origin of chemiosmosis, if early cells originated at alkaline hydrothermal vents, proton gradients can be maintained by the acidic ocean and alkaline water from white smokers while an inorganic membranous structure is in a rock cavity. If early cells originated in terrestrial pools such as hot springs, quinones present in meteorites like the Murchison meteorite would promote the development of proton gradients by coupled redox reactions if the ferricyanide, which would be an electron acceptor, was within the vesicle and an electron donor like a sulfur compound was outside of the lipid membrane. Because of the "water problem", a primitive ATP synthase and other biomolecules would go through hydrolysis due to the absence of wet-dry cycles at hydrothermal vents, unlike at terrestrial pools. Other researchers propose hydrothermal pore systems coated in mineral gels at deep sea hydrothermal vents to an alternative compartment of membranous structures, promote biochemical reactions of biopolymers, and could solve the "water problem". David Deamer and Bruce Damer argue that biomolecules would become trapped within these pore systems upon polymerization and would not undergo combinatorial selection. Catalytic FeS and NiS walls at alkaline hydrothermal vents has also been suggested to have promoted polymerization. It has been considered by other researchers that life originating in hydrothermal volcanic ponds exposed to UV radiation, zinc sulfide photocatalysis, and occurrence of continuous wet-dry cycling would not resemble biochemistry.

Montmorillonite bubbles

Another group suggests that primitive cells might have formed inside inorganic clay microcompartments, which can provide an ideal container for the synthesis and compartmentalization of complex organic molecules. Clay-armored bubbles form naturally when particles of montmorillonite clay collect on the outer surface of air bubbles under water. This creates a semi permeable vesicle from materials that are readily available in the environment. The authors remark that montmorillonite is known to serve as a chemical catalyst, encouraging lipids to form membranes and single nucleotides to join into strands of RNA. Primitive reproduction can be envisioned when the clay bubbles burst, releasing the lipid membrane-bound product into the surrounding medium.

Membraneless droplets

Another way to form primitive compartments that may lead to the formation of a protocell is polyesters membraneless structures that have the ability to host biochemicals (proteins and RNA) and/or scaffold the assemblies of lipids around them. While these droplets are leaky towards genetic materials, this leakiness could have facilitated the progenote hypothesis.

Membrane transport

For cellular organisms, the transport of specific molecules across compartmentalizing membrane barriers is essential in order to exchange content with their environment and with other individuals. For example, content exchange between individuals enables horizontal gene transfer, an important factor in the evolution of cellular life. While modern cells can rely on complicated protein machineries to catalyze these crucial processes, protocells must have accomplished this using more simple mechanisms.

Protocells composed of fatty acids would have been able to easily exchange small molecules and ions with their environment. Membranes consisting of fatty acids have a relatively high permeability to molecules such as nucleoside monophosphate (NMP), nucleoside diphosphate (NDP), and nucleoside triphosphate (NTP), and may withstand millimolar concentrations of Mg2+. Osmotic pressure can also play a significant role regarding this passive membrane transport.

Environmental effects have been suggested to trigger conditions under which a transport of larger molecules, such as DNA and RNA, across the membranes of protocells is possible. For example, it has been proposed that electroporation resulting from lightning strikes could enable such transport. Electroporation is the rapid increase in bilayer permeability induced by the application of a large artificial electric field across the membrane. During electroporation, the lipid molecules in the membrane shift position, opening up a pore (hole) that acts as a conductive pathway through which hydrophobic molecules like nucleic acids can pass the lipid bilayer. A similar transfer of content across protocells and with the surrounding solution can be caused by freezing and subsequent thawing. This could, for instance, occur in an environment in which day and night cycles cause recurrent freezing. Laboratory experiments have shown that such conditions allow an exchange of genetic information between populations of protocells. This can be explained by the fact that membranes are highly permeable at temperatures slightly below their phase transition temperature. If this point is reached during the freeze-thaw cycle, even large and highly charged molecules can temporarily pass the protocell membrane.

Some molecules or particles are too large or too hydrophilic to pass through a lipid bilayer even under these conditions, but can be moved across the membrane through fusion or budding of vesicles, events which have also been observed for freeze-thaw cycles. This may eventually have led to mechanisms that facilitate movement of molecules to the inside of the protocell (endocytosis) or to release its contents into the extracellular space (exocytosis).

Chemiosmosis is suggested to have been central for the origin of life. The proton gradients of protocells was possibly maintained by the acidic ocean and alkaline hydrothermal seawater at white smokers at porous systems. If not at a deep sea origin, redox reactions coupled to meteoric quinones would have led to the development of proton gradients maintained by an impermeable membrane composed of phospholipids at terrestrial pools.

Sexual reproduction

Eigen et al. and Woese proposed that the genomes of early protocells were composed of single-stranded RNA, and that individual genes corresponded to separate RNA segments, rather than being linked end-to-end as in present-day DNA genomes. A protocell that was haploid (one copy of each RNA gene) would be vulnerable to damage, since a single lesion in any RNA segment would be potentially lethal to the protocell (e.g. by blocking replication or inhibiting the function of an essential gene).

Vulnerability to damage could be reduced by maintaining two or more copies of each RNA segment in each protocell, i.e. by maintaining diploidy or polyploidy. Genome redundancy would allow a damaged RNA segment to be replaced by an additional replication of its homolog. For such a simple organism, the proportion of available resources tied up in the genetic material would be a large fraction of the total resource budget. Under limited resource conditions, the protocell reproductive rate would likely be inversely related to ploidy number, and the protocell's fitness would be reduced by the costs of redundancy. Consequently, coping with damaged RNA genes while minimizing the costs of redundancy would likely have been a fundamental problem for early protocells.

A cost-benefit analysis was carried out in which the costs of maintaining redundancy were balanced against the costs of genome damage. This analysis led to the conclusion that, under a wide range of circumstances, the selected strategy would be for each protocell to be haploid, but to periodically fuse with another haploid protocell to form a transient diploid. The retention of the haploid state maximizes the growth rate. The periodic fusions permit mutual reactivation of otherwise lethally damaged protocells. If at least one damage-free copy of each RNA gene is present in the transient diploid, viable progeny can be formed. For two, rather than one, viable daughter cells to be produced would require an extra replication of the intact RNA gene homologous to any RNA gene that had been damaged prior to the division of the fused protocell. The cycle of haploid reproduction, with occasional fusion to a transient diploid state, followed by splitting to the haploid state, can be considered to be the sexual cycle in its most primitive form. In the absence of this sexual cycle, haploid protocells with damage in an essential RNA gene would simply die.

This model for the early sexual cycle is hypothetical, but it is very similar to the known sexual behavior of the segmented RNA viruses, which are among the simplest organisms known. Influenza virus, whose genome consists of 8 physically separated single-stranded RNA segments, is an example of this type of virus. In segmented RNA viruses, "mating" can occur when a host cell is infected by at least two virus particles. If these viruses each contain an RNA segment with a lethal damage, multiple infection can lead to reactivation providing that at least one undamaged copy of each virus gene is present in the infected cell. This phenomenon is known as "multiplicity reactivation". Multiplicity reactivation has been reported to occur in influenza virus infections after induction of RNA damage by UV-irradiation, and ionizing radiation.

Artificial models

Langmuir–Blodgett deposition

Starting with a technique commonly used to deposit molecules on a solid surface, Langmuir–Blodgett deposition, scientists are able to assemble phospholipid membranes of arbitrary complexity layer by layer. These artificial phospholipid membranes support functional insertion both of purified and of in situ expressed membrane proteins. The technique could help astrobiologists understand how the first living cells originated.

Jeewanu protocells

Jeewanu protocells are synthetic chemical particles that possess cell-like structure and seem to have some functional living properties. First synthesized in 1963 from simple minerals and basic organics while exposed to sunlight, it is still reported to have some metabolic capabilities, the presence of semipermeable membrane, amino acids, phospholipids, carbohydrates and RNA-like molecules. The nature and properties of the Jeewanu remains to be clarified.

In a similar synthesis experiment a frozen mixture of water, methanol, ammonia and carbon monoxide was exposed to ultraviolet (UV) radiation. This combination yielded large amounts of organic material that self-organised to form globules or vesicles when immersed in water. The investigating scientist considered these globules to resemble cell membranes that enclose and concentrate the chemistry of life, separating their interior from the outside world. Remarkably, the globules fluoresced, or glowed, when exposed to UV light. Absorbing UV and converting it into visible light in this way was considered one possible way of providing energy to a primitive cell. If such globules played a role in the origin of life, the fluorescence could have been a precursor to primitive photosynthesis. Such fluorescence also provides the benefit of acting as a sunscreen, diffusing any damage that otherwise would be inflicted by UV radiation. Such a protective function would have been vital for life on the early Earth, since the ozone layer, which blocks out the sun's most destructive UV rays, did not form until after photosynthetic life began to produce oxygen.

Bio-like structures

The synthesis of three kinds of "jeewanu" have been reported; two of them were organic, and the other was inorganic. Other similar inorganic structures have also been produced. The investigating scientist (V. O. Kalinenko) referred to them as "bio-like structures" and "artificial cells". Formed in distilled water (as well as on agar gel) under the influence of an electric field, they lack protein, amino acids, purine or pyrimidine bases, and certain enzyme activities. According to NASA researchers, "presently known scientific principles of biology and biochemistry cannot account for living inorganic units" and "the postulated existence of these living units has not been proved".

Ethics and controversy

Protocell research has created controversy and opposing opinions, including criticism of vague definitions of "artificial life". The creation of a basic unit of life is the most pressing ethical concern, although the most widespread worry about protocells is their potential threat to human health and the environment through uncontrolled replication.

See also

 
 
 
 
 
 
 
 Protocell Circus, a film
 Pseudo-panspermia

References

Evolutionarily significant biological phenomena
Evolutionary biology
Membrane biology
Origin of life
Synthetic biology
Prebiotic chemistry